Samuel Mitchell (born 12 October 1982) is an Australian rules football coach and former player who is the current coach of the Hawthorn Football Club in the Australian Football League.

As a player, he played with the Hawthorn Football Club and West Coast Eagles in the Australian Football League. Following his retirement in 2017, Mitchell remained with West Coast as an assistant coach in 2018. In 2019, Mitchell returned to Hawthorn as the midfield coach before becoming head of development and senior coach of Hawthorn's VFL affiliate team, the Box Hill Hawks in 2021. In July 2021, Hawthorn appointed Mitchell as the next senior coach, taking over from Alastair Clarkson at the end of the 2021 season.

Early life 

A product of Mooroolbark, in Melbourne's outer eastern suburbs, Mitchell played in the under 18 TAC Cup competition with the Eastern Ranges. He was the club's best and fairest player in 1999 and 2000. Disappointed at being overlooked in the 2000 draft, Mitchell joined the Box Hill Hawks. After a couple of games in the development squad he gained promotion to the seniors and completed the season as the team's number one rover. He was a member of Box Hill's premiership side in 2001.

Playing career

Hawthorn 
Mitchell was recruited to the Hawthorn Football Club in the AFL in the 2001 AFL draft with selection number 36. This selection was received by Hawthorn in the deal which saw Trent Croad and Luke McPharlin traded to Fremantle, whilst Hawthorn gained selections one (Luke Hodge), 20 (Daniel Elstone) and number 36 (Mitchell).

The first half of his debut season in 2002 saw him playing with the Box Hill Hawks, until he broke into the Hawthorn side midway through the season. Following some unimpressive performances where he never managed more than 14 disposals, he was dropped for round 15 but was recalled after more eye-catching performances in round 19. He polled 31 votes in just 11 games to win the VFL's best and fairest award, the J. J. Liston Trophy.

In 2003 Mitchell continued to improve, winning the 2003 AFL Rising Star award and becoming known as "the Extractor" (particularly by commentator Brian Taylor) for his high amount of clearances and ability to win the ball out of middle of the ground.

A solid season followed in 2004, and in 2005 he played a "super" season until a foot injury sidelined him in round 15. For the 2006 season, Mitchell was named vice-captain of Hawthorn and displayed stellar form throughout the season culminating in winning the Peter Crimmins Medal for Hawthorn's best and fairest.

In 2007 he capped off another wonderful season by coming 3rd in the votes for the highest honour in Australian Football, the Brownlow Medal with 21 votes, 1 short of joint 2nd-place winners, North Melbourne's Brent Harvey and Brisbane's Simon Black who both polled 22 votes, and coming 8 votes behind winner of the 2007 Brownlow, Geelong's Jimmy Bartel.

On 6 October 2007, during the Peter Crimmins Medal Event, he was announced as Hawthorn's next captain, taking over the reins from retiring captain Richie Vandenberg.

Mitchell was ineligible for 2008's Brownlow Medal following a tripping charge in the match against Melbourne in round nine.

On Saturday, 27 September, Mitchell captained the Hawks to the 2008 premiership, the first in 17 years and the club's 10th, beating the reigning premiers, Geelong, by 26 points. Mitchell was reported for rough conduct against Geelong's Gary Ablett, Jr. in the second quarter, however the report was dismissed at the conclusion of the weekend.

At the end of the 2010 season he handed the captaincy over to Luke Hodge, who was made captain of the 2010 All-Australian team.

Mitchell polled 30 votes in the 2011 Brownlow Medal, but was ineligible to win after an incident in round 5 of the season; he had the second-most votes, behind Collingwood's Dane Swan. In 2012, Mitchell, along with Richmond's Trent Cotchin, both finished tied for second place in the Brownlow to Jobe Watson. On 12 January 2016 the World Anti-Doping Agency found Watson and another 33 Essendon players guilty of taking a prohibited substance during the 2012 AFL season, an AFL commission meeting in November 2016 determined the implications for the 2012 Brownlow Medal. On 15 November 2016, Mitchell and Cotchin were both retrospectively awarded the medal, and, on 13 December 2016, both were formally presented with the Medals in a private ceremony in Melbourne.

Mitchell was rewarded with the Peter Crimmins Medal in 2011, 2012 and 2016, and became a five-time best and fairest winner at Hawthorn, behind only Leigh Matthews who won eight during his career.

Mitchell became a triple premiership player with the Hawks in season 2014, and like a swathe of his team mates his year was interrupted by a serious injury.  After overcoming a serious hamstring injury that saw him miss nine weeks, it meant that Mitchell played only 16 of a possible 25 games for the Hawks, his lowest tally since 2005 when he played 14 games.  Still averaging over 28 disposals per game for the season mixing between midfield and half-back, Mitchell played a critical role in Hawthorn’s back-to-back premierships and was recognised as such by being named the side’s best player in the finals series by his coaches. Averaging 31.6 disposals, 9.0 marks, 6.3 tackles and 5.6 clearances across the three games, and was unlucky not to win the Norm Smith Medal in the Grand Final after 33 disposals, nine tackles, seven clearances and a goal assist.

Mitchell became a four-time premiership player with the Hawks in season 2015, with some considering it to be Sam Mitchell’s best AFL season to date in which he earned his third All Australian selection, but finished just behind Josh Gibson and Cyril Rioli in the Peter Crimmins Medal count.  His disposal tally of 748 and average of 31.2 topped the AFL and represents his own peak.  On 16 occasions Mitchell tallied 30 or more disposals, and collected a record-breaking 137 disposals across four matches during the finals.  Mitchell was again named the club’s Best Player in Finals. Polling 26 votes in the 2015 Brownlow Medal, Mitchell finished in the top three vote-getters for the third time in his career.

Mitchell played a total of 307 games and kicked a total of 67 goals for Hawthorn from 2002 until 2016.

West Coast Eagles 
In August 2017, he announced he would retire from the AFL at the end of the 2017 season. Mitchell played a total of 22 games and kicked a total of 4 goals for West Coast Eagles in 2017, in his only one season at the club.

Coaching career

West Coast Eagles
Shortly after his retirement from playing, Mitchell served as an assistant coach with the West Coast Eagles in 2018. At the conclusion of the 2018 AFL season, which saw West Coast win the AFL premiership in the 2018 AFL Grand Final, Mitchell departed the West Coast Eagles.

Hawthorn
At the conclusion of the 2018 AFL season, Mitchell returned to Hawthorn to serve as an assistant coach in the position of  midfield coach before becoming head of development and senior coach of Hawthorn's VFL affiliate team, the Box Hill Hawks in 2021.

On 6 July 2021, the Hawthorn Football Club announced that as part of a succession plan, Mitchell would succeed Alastair Clarkson as the senior coach of Hawthorn from 2023; until then, Mitchell will continue as Head of Development and as Box Hill Hawks senior coach. However, on 30 July 2021, it was announced that Clarkson would leave Hawthorn at the conclusion of the 2021 AFL season, with Mitchell immediately succeeding him.

Kneeing controversy
On 13 July 2015, Mitchell was found guilty by the AFL's match review panel of having kneed the right thigh of Fremantle Dockers player Nathan Fyfe during the second quarter of the previous day's game and was fined $1000 for the offence. The media then brought to light other kneeing incidents involving Mitchell, those being the kneeing of Adelaide Crows captain Taylor Walker in the round 12 game and the kneeing of Greater Western Sydney's Ryan Griffen in round 6 of the 2015 season. Another kneeing video incident surfaced of Mitchell kneeing North Melbourne defender Scott Thompson. The video shows Mitchell walking up to an unsuspecting Thompson and kneeing him in the left thigh. Media reports from 2008 show that an opposition club, Brisbane expressed concerns to the AFL about Sam Mitchell's kneeing of opponents.

Playing style
Mitchell is often cited as one of the most ambidextrous players in the AFL and much opinion is made about which is his preferred foot. Although some have claimed that he was originally a left footer who switched to right foot later in his junior career, Mitchell has stated that he has just always tried to use the appropriate foot for the situation.  He does however switch to his left foot when he wants to kick longer. Similarly, his handpassing is equally good with either hand.

Statistics

Playing statistics 

|-
| 2002 ||  || 28
| 9 || 1 || 1 || 53 || 48 || 101 || 19 || 29 || 0.1 || 0.1 || 5.9 || 5.3 || 11.2 || 2.1 || 3.2 || 1
|-
| 2003 ||  || 28
| 21 || 5 || 2 || 199 || 174 || 373 || 54 || 89 || 0.2 || 0.1 || 9.5 || 8.3 || 17.8 || 2.6 || 4.2 || 9
|-
| 2004 ||  || 5
| 20 || 5 || 5 || 210 || 162 || 372 || 47 || 60 || 0.3 || 0.3 || 10.5 || 8.1 || 18.6 || 2.4 || 3.0 || 2
|-
| 2005 ||  || 5
| 14 || 2 || 4 || 186 || 157 || 343 || 62 || 49 || 0.1 || 0.3 || 13.3 || 11.2 || 24.5 || 4.4 || 3.5 || 9
|-
| 2006 ||  || 5
| 22 || 3 || 6 || 327 || 265 || 592 || 119 || 71 || 0.1 || 0.3 || 14.9 || 12.0 || 26.9 || 5.4 || 3.2 || 13
|-
| 2007 ||  || 5
| 23 || 2 || 3 || 262 || 331 || 593 || 120 || 96 || 0.1 || 0.1 || 11.4 || 14.4 || 25.8 || 5.2 || 4.2 || 21
|-
| bgcolor=F0E68C | 2008# ||  || 5
| 24 || 4 || 2 || 313 || 354 || 667 || 90 || 88 || 0.2 || 0.1 || 13.0 || 14.8 || 27.8 || 3.8 || 3.7 || 15
|-
| 2009 ||  || 5
| 22 || 7 || 3 || 346 || 308 || 654 || 111 || 66 || 0.3 || 0.1 || 15.7 || 14.0 || 29.7 || 5.0 || 3.0 || 13
|-
| 2010 ||  || 5
| 19 || 5 || 4 || 282 || 242 || 524 || 76 || 90 || 0.3 || 0.2 || 14.8 || 12.7 || 27.6 || 4.0 || 4.7 || 15
|-
| 2011 ||  || 5
| 23 || 12 || 8 || 404 || 297 || 701 || 94 || 99 || 0.5 || 0.3 || 17.6 || 12.9 || 30.5 || 4.1 || 4.3 || 30
|-
| 2012 ||  || 5
| 24 || 7 || 7 || 345 || 308 || 653 || 84 || 133 || 0.3 || 0.3 || 14.4 || 12.8 || 27.2 || 3.5 || 5.5 || bgcolor=98FB98| 26±
|-
| bgcolor=F0E68C | 2013# ||  || 5
| 24 || 5 || 5 || 371 || 302 || 673 || 83 || 78 || 0.2 || 0.2 || 15.5 || 12.6 || 28.0 || 3.5 || 3.3 || 16
|-
| bgcolor=F0E68C | 2014# ||  || 5
| 16 || 3 || 3 || 228 || 221 || 449 || 78 || 55 || 0.2 || 0.2 || 14.3 || 13.8 || 28.1 || 4.9 || 3.4 || 8
|-
| bgcolor=F0E68C | 2015# ||  || 5
| 24 || 6 || 3 || 374 || 374 || bgcolor=CAE1FF | 748† || 98 || 92 || 0.3 || 0.1 || 15.6 || 15.6 || bgcolor=CAE1FF | 31.2† || 4.1 || 3.8 || 26
|-
| 2016 ||  || 5
| 22 || 0 || 3 || 343 || 309 || 652 || 80 || 79 || 0.0 || 0.1 || 15.6 || 14.0 || 29.6 || 3.6 || 3.6 || 16
|-
| 2017 ||  || 1
| 22 || 4 || 4 || 260 || 278 || 538 || 71 || 64 || 0.1 || 0.2 || 13.0 || 13.9 || 26.9 || 3.6 || 3.2 || 7
|- class="sortbottom"
! colspan=3| Career
! 329 !! 71 !! 63 !! 4503 !! 4130 !! 8633 !! 1286 !! 1238 !! 0.2 !! 0.2 !! 13.8 !! 12.6 !! 26.4 !! 3.9 !! 3.8 !! 227
|}

Coaching statistics 

Updated to the end of round 1, 2023.

|-
| 2022 || 
| 22 || 8 || 14 || 0 || 36.4% || 13 || 18
|-
| 2023 || 
| 1 || 0 || 1 || 0 || 0.0% || || 18
|- class="sortbottom"
! colspan=2| Career totals
! 23 !! 8 !! 15 !! 0 !! 34.8%
! colspan=2|
|}

Honours and achievements
Team
 4× AFL premiership player: 2008, 2013, 2014, 2015
 2× Minor premiership: 2012, 2013
 VFL premiership player: 2001

Individual
 AFL premiership captain: 2008
 Brownlow Medal: 2012
 3× All-Australian team: 2011, 2013, 2015
 Hawthorn Captain: 2008–2010
 5× Peter Crimmins Medal: 2006, 2009, 2011, 2012, 2016
 2× Lethal Award: 2015, 2016
 Norwich Rising Star Award: 2003
 J. J. Liston Trophy: 2002
 Col Austen Trophy: 2002
 Herald Sun Player of the Year Award: 2011
 2× Lou Richards Medal: 2011, 2015
 2× Australian international rules football team: 2014, 2015
 Victoria Australian rules football team: 2008
 AFL Rising Star nominee: 2003
 Hawthorn life member

Personal life 
Mitchell married Lyndall Degenhardt in early November 2009. They have a son and twin daughters.

References

External links

1982 births
Living people
Hawthorn Football Club players
Hawthorn Football Club Premiership players
Peter Crimmins Medal winners
AFL Rising Star winners
Box Hill Football Club players
J. J. Liston Trophy winners
Australian rules footballers from Melbourne
Eastern Ranges players
All-Australians (AFL)
Australian people of New Zealand descent
Brownlow Medal winners
West Coast Eagles players
Australia international rules football team players
Four-time VFL/AFL Premiership players
Hawthorn Football Club coaches
People from Box Hill, Victoria